Gary R. George (born March 8, 1954) is an American lawyer and Democratic politician from Milwaukee, Wisconsin.  He represented Milwaukee in the Wisconsin State Senate for 22 years before being recalled from office in 2003.

Background 
Born March 8, 1954, in Milwaukee, George graduated from Marquette University High School, and the University of Wisconsin–Madison and received his J.D. from University of Michigan in 1979. He is African-American.

Public office
George ran in 1980 in the Democratic primary election for the Wisconsin State Senate's Sixth District against incumbent Monroe Swan, who was considered the easy favorite. But Swan was removed from office due to a felony conviction for illegally using federally funded Comprehensive Employment and Training Act (CETA) money for his campaign for the nomination for lieutenant governor.

In the general election George easily defeated Republican James Barrington, thus winning his first Senate seat. He was reelected in 1984 and held the Senate office until 2003.

Political career
George served in many positions, including: Chair of the Senate Judiciary Committee, Co-chair of the Joint Legislative Audit Committee, and co-chair of the Joint Finance Committee (a position he held for four years).

George ran for governor in 2002. However, he never made it into the Democratic primaries, since the Election Board Commissioners were required to remove him from the ballot, because at least 221 signatures and addresses had been falsified, nullifying the validity of George's nomination.

George ran for governor of Wisconsin again in the 1998 Democratic primary against Ed Garvey, winning 20 percent of the vote. Garvey was later defeated by incumbent Republican governor Tommy Thompson in November.

A recall effort was launched against George in 1986. Earlier that year, George had publicly voiced his support for Ronald Reagan. He challenged the recall nomination signatures of his opponent. After winning his case against his opponent, the recall effort ended.

Recall 
Seventeen years after the first recall failed, another recall petition was initiated against Senator George after he voted against a bill sponsored by the Democratic Governor of Wisconsin, Jim Doyle. The bill supported gambling expansion at the Potawatomi Hotel & Casino in Milwaukee.

Over 15,000 signatures were gathered on the 2003 petition to recall George (8,071 signatures were needed to initiate an election). Jerrel Jones, owner of WNOV-AM and publisher of the Milwaukee Courier, paid individuals circulating the petition a dollar for each name collected. George contested the petition signatures all the way to the Wisconsin Supreme Court, which ruled against him. George rented an apartment inside his district but opponents claimed his primary residence was in the Town of Grafton outside his district limits.

The recall effort was successful and George was removed from office in 2003. Democratic Representative Spencer Coggs opposed George in the special primary election held on October 21, 2003. Coggs won the special primary election and was the only candidate on the special general election ballot of November 18, 2003.

Criminal convictions and allegations of conspiracy
George was convicted in 2004 of a felony, in a plea deal concerning a kickback scheme involving a Milwaukee social service agency, and sentenced to four years in federal prison for conspiring to defraud the government.

Soon after his 2007 release from prison, he was implicated by the federal Bureau of Alcohol, Tobacco, Firearms and Explosives in a plot to overthrow the government of Laos, but was not charged.

Later career 
In June 2014, George filed nomination papers to run against Congresswoman Gwen Moore in the Democratic primary, claiming that he was running "in response to citizen demands for stronger leadership from Milwaukee's political community." He lost in the August 2014 primary, with 21,234 votes to Moore's 52,380 (79%). He ran for the seat again in 2016 and 2018, though both efforts were unsuccessful.

George was initially disbarred prior to serving his prison sentence, but his legal license was reinstated by the Wisconsin Supreme Court in 2010.

References

1954 births
Living people
African-American state legislators in Wisconsin
Politicians from Milwaukee
Recalled state legislators of the United States
University of Michigan Law School alumni
University of Wisconsin–Madison alumni
Democratic Party Wisconsin state senators
Wisconsin politicians convicted of crimes
21st-century American politicians
Marquette University High School alumni
21st-century African-American politicians
20th-century African-American people